Rhino Season (Fasle Kargadan) is a 2012 Turkish-Iranian docufiction film directed by Bahman Ghobadi and presented by Martin Scorsese. Starring Behrouz Vossoughi, Monica Bellucci, Yılmaz Erdoğan, Caner Cindoruk, and Arash Labaf. The movie includes poems read and written by Bayan Nassir.

The film is based on Iranian Kurdish poet and author Sedigh Kamangar, who spent 27 years imprisoned in Iran while his family was told that he was dead. For many years Sadegh's family cried over a fake grave staged by the Iranian government.

Plot

Cast 
 Behrouz Vossoughi as Sahel 
 Monica Bellucci as Mina
 Yilmaz Erdogan as Akbar Rezai
 Arash Labaf as Son 
 Beren Saat as Daughter 
 Caner Cindoruk as Young Sahel
 Belçim Bilgin as Female Pimp

Production

Reception
On Metacritic, the film has a weighted average score of 66 out of 100, based on 6 critics, indicating "generally favorable reviews."

John DeFoe of The Hollywood Reporter wrote, "Haunting feature that crafts fiction from the inspiration of real-life Kurdish-Iranian poet Sadegh Kamangar. Co-star Monica Bellucci may attract much of the attention Stateside, but the film's ravishing aesthetic and multiple points of political interest will make it fascinating to many cineastes".

Awards and nominations

References

External links
 
 
 

2012 films
Films directed by Bahman Ghobadi
Persian-language films
Iraqi documentary films
Turkish documentary films
Iranian multilingual films
Iranian documentary films
2012 multilingual films
Turkish multilingual films
Iranian Revolution films
Films about rhinoceroses
Films shot in Turkey
Docufiction films